Ekaterina Dzehalevich and Anastasiya Yakimova were the defending champions. They are both present but do not compete together.
Dzehalevich partnered with Yaroslava Shvedova, but were forced to withdraw before their quarterfinals match against Alexandra Panova and Magdaléna Rybáriková due to an illness for Shvedova.
Yakimova partnered with Vesna Manasieva, but lost in the first round to Ekaterina Dzehalevich and Yaroslava Shvedova.

Ioana Raluca Olaru and Olga Savchuk won in the final 5–7, 7–5, 10–7, against Nina Bratchikova and Kathrin Wörle.

Seeds

  Ekaterina Dzehalevich /  Yaroslava Shvedova (quarterfinals, withdrew due to an illness for Shvedova)
  Akgul Amanmuradova /  Olga Govortsova (first round)
  Tatiana Poutchek /  Arina Rodionova  (quarterfinals)
  Anna Lapushchenkova /  Monica Niculescu (quarterfinals, withdrew due to an illness for Lapushchenkova)

Draw

Draw

External links
Draw

Doubles
Tashkent Open
2008 in Uzbekistani sport